The XXIst Central American and Caribbean Games were held in Mayagüez, Puerto Rico from July 17, 2010 to August 1, 2010.

Medals

Bronze
Juan Carlos Cardona — Athletics, Men's Marathon

Results by event

See also
Colombia at the 2008 Summer Olympics

References

External links

Nations at the 2010 Central American and Caribbean Games
2010
Central American and Caribbean Games